Lagan Valley is a parliamentary constituency in the United Kingdom House of Commons. The current MP is Sir Jeffrey Donaldson, leader of the Democratic Unionist Party. The constituency has always returned unionist MPs.

Boundaries 

1983–1997: The District of Lisburn, and the District of Castlereagh ward of Carryduff.

1997–2010: The District of Lisburn wards of Ballinderry, Ballymacash, Ballymacbrennan, Ballymacoss, Blaris, Derryaghy, Dromara, Drumbo, Dunmurry, Glenavy, Harmony Hill, Hilden, Hillhall, Hillsborough, Knockmore, Lagan Valley, Lambeg, Lisnagarvey, Maghaberry, Magheralave, Maze, Moira, Old Warren, Seymour Hill, Tonagh, and Wallace Park, and the District of Banbridge wards of Dromore North, Dromore South, Gransha, and Quilly.

2010–present: The City of Lisburn wards of Ballinderry, Ballymacash, Ballymacbrennan, Ballymacoss, Blaris, Dromara, Drumbo, Harmony Hill, Hilden, Hillhall, Hillsborough, Knockmore, Lagan Valley, Lambeg, Lisnagarvey, Maghaberry, Magheralave, Maze, Moira, Old Warren, Seymour Hill, Tonagh, Wallace Park, and part of Derryaghy; the District of Banbridge wards of Dromore North, Dromore South, Gransha, and Quilly and the Ballynahatty and Edenderry parts of the Belvoir ward of the City of Belfast.

The seat was created in 1983, as part of an expansion of Northern Ireland's constituencies from 12 to 17, and was predominantly made up from parts of South Antrim and North Down. In their original proposals, in January 1980, the boundary commission proposed calling it 'Lagan'. In further revisions in 1995 it lost some areas to both Belfast West and Strangford. Currently the constituency contains most of Lisburn district and part of Banbridge district.

Following their review of all parliamentary seats in Northern Ireland prior to the 2010 United Kingdom general election the Boundary Commission for Northern Ireland made alterations to Lagan Valley. In an unprecedented decision, passed by Parliament through the Northern Ireland Parliamentary Constituencies Order, one electoral ward was split between two constituencies. This followed concerns in Derryaghy about being moved into the neighbouring West Belfast seat.

History 
For the history of the equivalent constituencies prior to 1950 please see Antrim (UK Parliament constituency) and Down (UK Parliament constituency) and from 1950 until 1983, please see South Antrim (UK Parliament constituency) and North Down.

Members of Parliament 
The Member of Parliament since 1997 is Sir Jeffrey Donaldson who was elected as a member of the Ulster Unionist Party but switched to the Democratic Unionist Party in 2004. He succeeded James Molyneaux who had represented the seat for the UUP since the 1983 general election and previously sat for the old South Antrim constituency which covered much of the same area. Donaldson was elected Leader of the DUP in June 2021.

Elections

Elections in the 2010s 

This seat saw the largest decrease in vote share for the DUP at the 2019 general election.

Elections in the 2000s

Elections in the 1990s

Elections in the 1980s

See also 
 List of parliamentary constituencies in Northern Ireland

References

External links 
2017 Election House Of Commons Library 2017 Election report
A Vision Of Britain Through Time (Constituency elector numbers)

Westminster Parliamentary constituencies in Northern Ireland
Constituencies of the Parliament of the United Kingdom established in 1983
Politics of County Antrim
Politics of County Down